Muhammad al-Fayturi, also spelled Muhammad al-Fītūrī, was a  Sudanese–Libyan poet writer, poet, playwright, and ambassador.

Biography
Al-Fayturi  1936 in Al Geneina in Western Darfur, Sudan, and his paternal family belonged to the Masalit people. His father was a Sufi sheikh of Libyan descent, and his mother was Egyptian.

He grew up in Alexandria, Egypt, and studied Islamic sciences, philosophy and history at Al-Azhar University until 1953, and then continued his studies in literature at Cairo University. After this, he joined the Institute of Political Science in Cairo.

Al-Fayturi started writing classical Arabic poetry at the age of 13 and later became one of the major figures of contemporary Arabic poetry

Career
Al-Fayturi worked as journalist, and later, editor for Sudanese or Egyptian newspapers at the age of 17. Moreover, he was an acclaimed poet, and also was appointed as diplomat, political and cultural counsellor, and then as ambassador of Libya in several countries, including Lebanon and Morocco. From 1968–1970, he was appointed as an expert for the Arab League. He also was a member of the Arab Writers Union.

In 1953 he published his first collection of poems entitled 'Aga'nni Afriqia' (in English: 'Songs of Africa').

Al-Fayturi died in Rabat, Morocco, in 2015. In an obituary, the Lebanese newspaper The Daily Star wrote: "His work particularly draws upon his experience as an African living among Arabs, and thus addresses issues such as race, class and colonialism."

Selected works
Poetry
Aga'nni Afriqia, Arabic أغاني إفريقيا or The Songs of Africa, poetry collection, published 1956.
Ashiq meen Afriqia, Arabic عاشق من إفريقيا Lover from Africa poetry collection, 1964.
Azkor'inni Yaa Afriqia, Arabic اذكريني يا إفريقيا,or Remember Me Africa, poetry collection, 1965.
Seqoe't Dobshliem, Arabic سقوط دبشليم, or Collapse of Doapashalim, poetry collection, 1968.
Ma'zoffa lee Darawessh Matagool, Arabic معزوفة لدرويش متجول, or The Lyric of Roaming Dervish, poetry collection 1969.
Al-battel w'el thorra w'el Mshnaqeh, Arabic  البطل والثورة والمشنقة or Hero, Revolution and Gallows, 1972 poetry collection.
Agawall Shahid Atheba't, Arabic  أقوال شاهد إثبات, or The Saying of Witness, poetry, 1973.
Abtasami hatta tamo'r el-khail, Arabic  ابتسمي حتى تمر الخيل, or Smile Until The Horses Passes, poetry, 1975.
Aesfoort el' daam, Arabic  عصفورة الدم, or Bloody Bird, poetry, 1983.

Theatrical plays

Solara, Arabic سولارا, drama, 1970.
Thorrat Omer El-mokhata'r, Arabic ثورة عمر المختار, or The Revolution of Omer El-Mokhata'r, drama, 1974

Nonfiction
Allam Al-Sahafa al-arabia wa-al Ajnabiya, Arabic عالم الصحافة العربية والأجنبية, in English: The World of Arab and Foreign Journalism, Damascus, 1981.
Al-moojab wa-al s'alieb. Arabic  الموجب والسالب في الصحافة العربية, in English: The Positive and Negative in Arabic Journalism, Damascus, 1986.

See also 

 Modern Arabic literature

 Sudanese literature

References

Further reading 
 Alansary, Abdulhamid. (2020). Identity Crisis as Postcolonial Problematic in Muhammad Al-Fayturi's Songs of Africa and Sahar Khalifeh's The Inheritance
Babikir, Adil (ed.) (2019). Modern Sudanese Poetry: An Anthology. Lincoln, NE, USA. 
 Gohar, M. S., & Smithsonian Libraries.  2007). Confronting the history of slavery and colonization in the poetry of M. Al-Fayturi and Langston Hughes. Research Review - Institute of African Studies, p. 1-21.
 Oladosu, Afis Ayinde. (2008) Is It Because My Face Is Black? Journal of Arabic Literature, vol. 39/2, p. 184–215. ISSN 0085-2376

External links
Sorrows of the Black City on poetrytranslation.org
Interview: Umm Kulthum asked me to "recap" the poem .. and she refused

1936 births
2015 deaths
Sudanese dramatists and playwrights
Libyan dramatists and playwrights
20th-century Sudanese poets
Libyan poets
20th-century Sudanese writers
Sudanese non-fiction writers
Sudanese people of Libyan descent
Sudanese people of Egyptian descent
Libyan people of Egyptian descent
20th-century Libyan writers
21st-century Sudanese poets